Silsangsa Temple is a temple of the Jogye Order located in Namwon, North Jeolla Province, South Korea. The temple is a branch temple of the Geumsan Temple in Iksan. Although the temple is legally situated in Namwon, it is also quite near the Hamyang county of South Gyeongsang Province. It is exceptional since this temple is in a field, as opposed to most Korean temples, which are located in mountainous areas.

It is said that the temple was constructed in the era of Heungdeok of Silla by the great monk Hongcheok (fl. 830), a student of Zhiyi, after he returned from Tang China. Since the king himself showed deep faith and devoted himself with the Crown Prince in this temple, the place became highly celebrated, eventually becoming the founding location of the Silsang school of Chan Buddhism. Silsangsa is the oldest  temple among the Nine mountain schools.

The temple faced a period of decline during the Joseon era when the structures were destroyed by fire. From this point on, the temple was shut down, although it was later restored three times during the eras of Sukjong of Joseon, Sunjo of Joseon and Gojong of Korea. However, the temple never returned to its previous grand scale.

The Korean War harmed parts of the temple, as fighting forces often passed through the area, but most of the cultural relics remained intact.

Cultural relics 
The three-tier stone pagoda in the temple is registered as National Treasures of South Korea 10. Also designated as treasures are ten relics from the Silla era, which is the largest number of cultural relics found in a single temple.

References

Notes
 실상사의 역사
 실상사 철불에 녹이 스는 까닭? - <몸따라 마음따라 112>보물 제41호 '실상사 철제여래좌상'

External links

Silasangsa temple-실상사

Religious organizations established in the 9th century
Silla
Namwon
National Treasures of South Korea
Tourist attractions in North Jeolla Province
Historic Sites of South Korea
Buddhist temples in South Korea
9th-century establishments in Korea
Religious buildings and structures completed in 828